Loon Lake may refer to:

Lakes
A loonlake, loon-lake, or loon lake, easily referred to as the loon equivalent of a duckpond, is a term referring to any lake that is home to loons.

United States
Loon Lake (California), El Dorado County
Loon Lake (Kendall County, Illinois), in the Silver Springs State Fish and Wildlife Area
Loon Lake (Lake County, Illinois)
Loon Lake (Indiana), a lake in Indiana
Loon Lake (Gogebic County, Michigan)
Loon Lake (Waterford Township, Michigan)
Loon Lake (Blue Earth County, Minnesota)
Loon Lake (Cass County, Minnesota)
Loon Lake (Cook County, Minnesota)
Loon Lake (Jackson County, Minnesota), in Jackson County, Minnesota
Loon Lake (Waseca County, Minnesota), in Waseca County, Minnesota
Loon Lake (Lake County, Montana), in Lake County, Montana
Loon Lake (Missoula County, Montana), in Missoula County, Montana
Loon Lake (Steuben County, New York)
Loon Lake (Warren County, New York)
Loon Lake (New Hampshire), in Carroll County, New Hampshire
Loon Lake (Oregon), Douglas County
Loon Lake (Washington), Stevens County
Loon Lake, New York

Canada
Loon Lake (Nova Scotia), the name of several lakes in Nova Scotia
Loon Lake, British Columbia, in British Columbia
Loon Lake (Vancouver Island), on British Columbia's Vancouver Island
Loon Lake (Ontario), near the village of Westport, Ontario

Locations

United States
Loon Lake, Illinois
Loon Lake Township, Cass County, Minnesota, a township in Cass County, Minnesota
Loon Lake, Washington

Canada
Loon Lake, Alberta, a hamlet
Loon Lake, Nova Scotia, a cottage community and a lake
Rural Municipality of Loon Lake No. 561, Saskatchewan, a rural municipality 
Loon Lake, Saskatchewan, a village
Loon Lake Indian Reserve No. 10, an Indian Reserve of the  Alkali Lake Indian Band in the Central Cariboo region, British Columbia
Loon Lake Indian Reserve No. 4, an Indian Reserve of the Bonaparte Indian Band in the South Cariboo region of British Columbia
Loon Lake Provincial Park, a provincial park in Thompson-Nicola Regional District

Arts and entertainment
Loon Lake (novel), a novel by E. L. Doctorow
Symphony No. 63, "Loon Lake", Op. 411 by Alan Hovhaness
Loon Lake (band), an Australian indie rock band